Puka Mach'ay (Quechua puka red, mach'ay cave, "red cave", also spelled Pucamachay) is a mountain in the Andes of Peru, about  high. It is located in the Pasco Region, Daniel Alcides Carrión Province, Yanahuanca District. Puka Mach'ay lies northeast of Saqra Mach'ay.

References

Mountains of Peru
Mountains of Pasco Region